Code words used by the Royal Air Force during the Second World War:
Angels – height in thousands of feet.
Bandit – identified enemy aircraft.
Bogey – unidentified (possibly unfriendly) aircraft.
Buster – radio-telephony code phrase for 'maximum throttle' or full power climb.
Channel Stop – Air operations intended to stop enemy shipping passing through the Strait of Dover.
Circus – daytime bomber attacks with fighter escorts against short range targets, to occupy enemy fighters and keep them in the area concerned.
Diver – radio-telephony code word for a sighted V-1 flying bomb.
Flower – Counter-air patrols in the area of enemy airfields to preventing aircraft from taking off and attacking those aircraft that succeeded.
Gardening – mine-laying operations.
Instep – missions to restrict attacks on Coastal Command aircraft by maintaining a presence over the Western Approaches.
Intruder – offensive patrols to destroy enemy aircraft over their own territory, usually carried out at night.
Jim Crow – coastal patrols to intercept enemy aircraft crossing the British coastline; originally intended to warn of invasion in 1940.
Kipper – patrols to protect fishing boats in the North Sea against air attack.
Mahmoud – sorties flown by de Havilland Mosquitoes equipped with rear-facing radar; when an enemy aircraft was detected a 180° turn enabled an attack.
Mandolin – attacks on enemy railway transport and other ground targets.
Noball – attacks on V-weapons launch sites and related targets.
Ramrod – short range bomber attacks to destroy ground targets, similar to Circus attacks.
Ranger – freelance flights over enemy territory by units of any size, to occupy and tire enemy fighters.
Rhubarb – fighter or fighter-bomber sections, at times of low cloud and poor visibility, crossing the English Channel and then dropping below cloud level to search for opportunity targets such as railway locomotives and rolling stock, aircraft on the ground, enemy troops, and vehicles on roads.
Roadstead – dive bombing and low level attacks on enemy ships at sea or in harbour.
Rodeo – fighter sweeps over enemy territory.
Rover – armed reconnaissance flights with attacks on opportunity targets.
Scramble – fast take-off and climb to intercept enemy aircraft.
Tally-ho – radio-telephony code word for 'enemy in sight'.
Jager - A hostile aircraft that is higher altitude than the pilots aircraft

See also
 List of World War II electronic warfare equipment
 Multiservice tactical brevity code

References 

Royal Air Force
RAF
Wikipedia glossaries using unordered lists